The Five cent coin (commonly called Stuiver) was a coin struck in the Kingdom of the Netherlands between 1818 and 2001.
Twenty stuivers equalled a Dutch Guilder.

Dimensions and weight

Source

Versions

Source

References

External links
Obverses and reverses

Guilder
Coins of the Netherlands
Five-cent coins